Nonancourt is a commune in the Eure department in Normandy in northern France. The writer Louis-François Beffara (1751–1838) and the playwright Lucien Besnard (1872–1955) were born in Nonancourt. Nonancourt station has rail connections to Argentan, Paris and Granville.

Since 1975 Nonancourt has been twinned with Earls Colne in Essex.

Population

See also
Communes of the Eure department

References

Communes of Eure